The Scotch Old Collegians Football Club (SOCFC) is an Australian rules football club located in Torrens Park, South Australia, playing in the South Australian Amateur Football League. The club is one of the sports sections of Scotch College, Adelaide and was formed in 1929 and it is the fifth-oldest club in the SAAFL. 

Scotch fields three teams, one each in Division 3, Division 3 Reserves and C3. SOCFC draws its players from old collegians of Scotch College and from the local community.  All teams train at Scotch College with the A and B grade teams also playing home matches there.

Apart from men's and women's football, the College has also sports sections for cricket, netball, rowing, and soccer.

History 
Scotch Old Collegians Football Club was formed in 1929. There have been around 225 different clubs that have participated in the South Australian Amateur Football League since its inception in 1911. Only Adelaide University (1911), Kenilworth (1914), Prince Alfred Old Collegians (1926) and St Peters Old Collegians (1928) have been in the SAAFL longer than Scotch OCFC.

Premierships
A Grade:
1959,
1989,
1997,
2018

B Grade:
1970,
1971,
1986,
1997

C Grade:
1980,
1983,
2002,
2003,
2004,
2006

D Grade:
1991,
1992

VFL/AFL players
 Michael Perry, Richmond (1965-1969)

References

External links
 

Australian rules football clubs in South Australia
1929 establishments in Australia
Australian rules football clubs established in 1929
Adelaide Footy League clubs
Australian rules football clubs in New South Wales